"Don't Wanna Lose You" is a song by American singer and songwriter Lionel Richie. It was written by Richie along with James Harris III and Terry Lewis for his fourth studio album, Louder Than Words (1996), while production was helmed by Harris and Lewis under their production moniker Jimmy Jam and Terry Lewis.

Critical reception
Larry Flick from Billboard wrote, "Richie ends a lengthy break from recording with a smooth, rhythmic ballad that eagle-ears will quickly compare to his classic Commodores hit "Just To Be Close To You". There is a sweet, unmistakable melodic vibe linking the two songs—creating a warm familiarity that will help raise the interest and awareness of radio programmers at top 40, R&B, and AC. It is nice to have Richie's friendly baritone back on active duty, and producers Jimmy Jam and Terry Lewis have treated it with proper respect and TLC, as evident in the lush arrangement of quiet funk guitars and sweet strings."

Track listings

Credits and personnel
Credits lifted from the album's liner notes.

James Harris III – producer, writer
Steve Hodge – mixing
Terry Lewis – producer, writer
Lionel Richie – vocals, writer

Charts

Weekly charts

Year-end charts

Release history

References

1996 singles
1996 songs
Lionel Richie songs
Songs written by Lionel Richie
Song recordings produced by Jimmy Jam and Terry Lewis
Mercury Records singles
Songs written by Jimmy Jam and Terry Lewis